Milton of Balgonie is a small village in central Fife, Scotland. Nearby attractions include Balgonie Castle which is situated between Milton and Coaltown. The ruins of Balfour House, where Mary, Queen of Scots sometimes resided, are to the south of the village.

The village has been home to a number of industries through the ages, from flax, flour and wood mills, and to coal mining, although none now remain active: the sawmill being the last standing, but already partially redeveloped.

The coal mine was situated at the west end and was the 'ingaun ee' type: a mine accessible by walking into rather than a vertical shaft. There is little remaining apart from a bricked up entrance in the wall opposite Castle View, some concrete stairs, and the sloped mound of the entrance in the field behind.

References

Sources

 The Gazetteer for Scotland

Villages in Fife
Mining communities in Fife